= Lesterud =

District of Bærum, Norway

Coordinates: 59°57′09″N 10°30′46″E

Lesterud is a district in the municipality of Bærum, Norway. Its population (2007) is 3,302.
